M. Paul Friedberg, FASLA, (born 1931) is an American landscape architect.

Biography
M. Paul Friedberg was born in New York City where he attended Cornell University. In 1954 he graduated with a Bachelor of Science degree. He said that "after navigating four socially active years the reality of growing up set in." He said that his largest influence for pursuing landscape architecture was the chance to connect people to themselves, to each other and to their environment.

In 1958, four years after graduating, Friedberg opened his landscape practice, M. Paul Friedberg and Partners. The contributions the firm has made to the aesthetic environment of urban life have been revolutionary in design and intent. Here, he soon became a leading Landscape Architect of new public spaces. All of which included plazas, main strip malls, and small vest-pocket parks. Paul Friedberg also established the first undergraduate landscape architecture program in a major city at the City College of New York, focusing on the social and physical issues inherent to an urban environment.

In 1965 M. Paul Friedberg designed an innovative play area at Riis plaza that would later be demolished in 2000. This innovative play area was created to allow children of different ages to utilize the many different structures including a series of pyramids, mounds, and a tunnel in many ways.

In his seventies, M. Paul Friedberg continues to work and design at an amazing pace. To sum up his job, Friedberg happily smiles and says it is "not a bad way to spend [my] day,". Due to Friedberg, landscape architecture was brought into the field of urban design on a large scale through the wide variety of urban spaces represented by his work. His personal philosophy is summed up in the following quote:

Design is a personal journey. The fact that I have the power to alter the appearance and content of a site merely by placing ideas on a piece of paper or a screen, is an ongoing adventure-and exploration into the unknown about how space and form can direct human response. It is about the discovery of myself, my aesthetic preference and social values at a given point in time. I create three-dimensionally what the writer accomplishes with words. It is not without anxiety, as the ideas haven't a reality until cast in a space and experienced.--M. Paul Friedberg, Silent Auction

Jacob Riis Plaza
One of Friedberg's most notable projects was the Jacob Riis Plaza, undertaken in the mid-1960s. The Jacob Riis Complex is a series of 14-story buildings along the Lower East Side of Manhattan. The large open spaces between the blocks were poorly laid out, with little consideration of the residents' needs. Friedberg's redesign separated the space into human scaled areas using pergolas, terraces and mounds. Materials and features were selected for their robustness, for example large timbers, and vandal resistant lighting.

Other major projects
 Peavey Plaza, Minneapolis, Minnesota
 Olympic Plaza, Calgary, Alberta, Canada
 Madison Mall, Madison, Wisconsin
 Pershing Park, Washington, D.C.
 Loring Park, Minneapolis
 Fort Worth Cultural District, Fort Worth, Texas
 Master plan for a proposed new state capital city in Willow, Alaska
 Colony Square Site Plan, Atlanta, Georgia

External links
 Loring Park, Minneapolis  
 Loring Pier
 Madison Mall
 M. Paul Friedberg speaks about his career and American urban spaces

References

Bloom, Nicholas Dagen. A Call To Order: What the History of the New York City Housing Teaches Us About the Future and Past of Social Welfare Policy. Adelphi University. 25 October 2005. 
 Hopper, Leonard, J. 2004 ASLA Design Medal American Society of Landscape Architects. 2004.

2. “M. Paul Friedberg.” M. Paul Friedberg | The Cultural Landscape Foundation, tclf.org/pioneer/m-paul-friedberg.

1931 births
Living people
American landscape architects
Cornell University College of Agriculture and Life Sciences alumni
20th-century American Jews
21st-century American Jews